The uvular ejective fricative is a type of consonantal sound, used in some spoken languages.

Features
Features of the uvular ejective fricative:

Occurrence

See also
 Index of phonetics articles

References

External links
 

Fricative consonants
Uvular consonants
Ejectives
Oral consonants